The 2017 Drive for the Cure 300 presented by Blue Cross Blue Shield of North Carolina was the 29th stock car race of the 2017 NASCAR Xfinity Series season, the third and elimination race of the Round of 12, and the 36th iteration of the event. The race was held on Saturday, October 7, 2017, in Concord, North Carolina at Charlotte Motor Speedway, a 1.5 miles (2.4 km) permanent quad-oval. The race took the scheduled 200 laps to complete. Alex Bowman, driving for Chip Ganassi Racing, would control the late stages of the race to win his first and to date, only career NASCAR Xfinity Series victory and his only win of the season. To fill out the podium, Sam Hornish Jr. and Ryan Blaney, both driving for Team Penske, would finish second and third, respectively.

The eight drivers to advance to the Round of 8 were William Byron, Justin Allgaier, Elliott Sadler, Daniel Hemric, Cole Custer, Brennan Poole, Ryan Reed, and Matt Tifft.

Background 

The race was held at Charlotte Motor Speedway, located in Concord, North Carolina. The speedway complex includes a 1.5-mile (2.4 km) quad-oval track that was utilized for the race, as well as a dragstrip and a dirt track. The speedway was built in 1959 by Bruton Smith and is considered the home track for NASCAR with many race teams based in the Charlotte metropolitan area. The track is owned and operated by Speedway Motorsports Inc. (SMI) with Marcus G. Smith serving as track president.

Entry list 

 (R) denotes rookie driver.
 (i) denotes driver who is ineligible for series driver points.

Practice

First practice 
The first practice session was held on Friday, October 6, at 3:00 PM EST. The session would last for 55 minutes.

Second and final practice 
The final practice session, sometimes known as Happy Hour, was held on Friday, October 6, at 6:00 PM EST. The session would last for 55 minutes.

Qualifying 
Qualifying was originally scheduled to be held on Saturday, October 7. However, inclement weather would cancel the session. The starting lineup was determined by the current owner's points. As a result, Daniel Suárez, driving for Joe Gibbs Racing, would win the pole.

Full starting lineup

Race results 
Stage 1 Laps: 45

Stage 2 Laps: 45

Stage 3 Laps: 110

Standings after the race 

Drivers' Championship standings

Note: Only the first 12 positions are included for the driver standings.

References 

2017 NASCAR Xfinity Series
NASCAR races at Charlotte Motor Speedway
October 2017 sports events in the United States
2017 in sports in North Carolina